Controlled-access highways in Poland are part of the national roads network and they are divided into motorways and expressways. Both types of highways feature grade-separated interchanges with all other roads, emergency lanes, feeder lanes, wildlife protection measures and dedicated roadside rest areas. Motorways differ from expressways in their technical parameters, like designated speed, permitted road curvature, lane widths or minimal distances between interchanges. Moreover, expressways might have single carriageway sections in case of low traffic densities (as of 2023, the single-carriageway sections constitute 5% of the controlled-access highway network).

As of January 2023, there are 4887 km of motorways and expressways in operation (58% of the intended network), while contracts for construction of further 1170 km of motorways and expressways (15% of the intended network) are ongoing.

Except for the single-carriageway expressways, both types of highways fulfill the definition of a motorway as characterized by OECD, WRA or Vienna Convention. Speed limits in Poland are 140 km/h on motorways and 120 km/h on dual-carriageway expressways.

Technical parameters 
 Motorways are public roads with controlled access which are designated for motor vehicles only, and feature two carriageways with at least two continuous lanes each, divided by a median. They have no one-level intersections with any roads or other forms of land and water transport. They are equipped with roadside rest areas, which are intended only for the users of the motorway.

Some motorway stretches are tolled, others are free of charge. Motorways are the only roads in Poland which use blue background on road signs - others use green road signs.

 Expressways share most of the characteristics of motorways, differing mainly in that:

 Expressways are designated for lower speed than motorways. For example, the road curvature can be higher and the lanes are usually narrower (3.5m vs 3.75m). Emergency lanes can also be narrower, and in exceptional situations expressways might not have them at all.
 Expressways can have a single carriageway on sections with low traffic density.
 Motorways can have interchanges only with main roads and the spacing between interchanges should not be less than 15 km (exceptionally 5 km); or not less than 5 km (exceptionally 3 km) within borders or near a big city or a group of cities. Expressways can have interchanges more often. In exceptional situations, expressways might not have dedicated feeder lanes on an interchange.

Technically, expressways are also allowed to admit a one-level junction with a minor public road in exceptional cases, however the last such remaining junction in Poland has been reconstructed into a two-level interchange by June 2020. The definitions and technical parameters of highways are defined in the Public Roads Act of 21 March 1985 (with later amendments), and the ministry ordinance of 2 March 1999 (with later amendments).

As of 2023, the operational sections of highways utilize the following cross-sections:
 89% (4334 km) – motorways and expressways with 2x2 lanes,
 6% (303 km) – motorways and expressways with 2x3 or (occasionally) 2x4 or 2x5 lanes,
 5% (250 km) – single-carriageway sections, of which:
 3.5% (171 km) – single-carriageway expressways with 1+1 lanes, as well as under-construction sections of motorway A18 with 1+1 lanes available on the northern carriageway,
 1.25% (63 km) – single-carriageway expressways with 1+1 lanes and dual-carriageway fragments (2x2) around the interchanges,
 0.25% (16 km) – single-carriageway expressways with interchanging 2+1 lanes.

All single-carriageway highways are constructed with allocated space for a possible upgrade to dual-carriageway and all bridges above such highways are prepared to accommodate the second carriageway. Most of those sections are planned to be widened to full profile by 2033, the exceptions being S1 (near the Slovak border) and S22 (near the Russian border) where widening is currently not expected.

Speed limits

Substandard highways 
Motorways and expressways constructed before 1999 do not have to fulfill technical parameters listed in the ordinance. As of 2022, one notable case of a substandard highway remains:
 A4 on the section Krzyżowa – Wrocław was constructed in years 1934 – 1937 (then the territory of Nazi Germany) and renovated in years 2002 – 2006. The road received new high quality surface but the geometry was kept unchanged and many overpasses above the motorway were kept. In effect, this part has no emergency lanes (which by current standards is only occasionally allowed on expressways and never on motorways) and speed limit is decreased to 110 km/h. A contract for preparing technical documentation for the section's full reconstruction (and widening to three lanes per direction) was signed in 2019.

Notable historical cases are:
 S3 near Szczecin (19 km) was opened in 1979 and, until the reconstruction in years 2019 – 2020, featured two at-grade road intersections as the last such expressway section in Poland.
 A6 near Szczecin (29 km) was constructed by Nazi Germany and kept using the original surface made of concrete slabs until the reconstruction conducted in years 1996 – 1999 and (easternmost fragment) 2017 – 2021.
 A18 (70 km) had its southern carriageway constructed by Nazi Germany. The northern carriageway was constructed in 2004 – 2006, while southern carriageway kept using the original concrete slabs until the reconstruction started in 2020 / 2021. Currently, the high quality northern carriageway carries bidirectional traffic for the time of reconstruction. Section is not signed as a motorway.

Tolls 

Motorways A1, A2 and A4 are planned as tolled, and some of their sections are already such (see the full list below). The other highways are free of payment for vehicles up to 3.5 tons (Note: The permissible maximum weight of a vehicle is considered; in case of a passenger car with a trailer, the joint permissible maximum weight of the car and the trailer must not exceed 3.5 tons). There are two systems of collecting tolls:

Electronic Toll Collection System 
The e-toll system has been introduced on 1 December 2021. The drivers need to buy tickets in advance or use one of the available mobile apps: Autopay supporting all motorway sections with electronic toll collection (i.e. all tolled sections except for privately-owned sections of A2), or dedicated apps of each motorway operator. The mobile application should be running while the motorway is being used.

The police can fine a driver who is using the motorway without a valid ticket or a mobile application, and the motorway operator can send a fine to the car owner if the motorway cameras catch the license plates of a car not registered in the system. As an emergency option, a person who have used a state-owned tolled section while unaware of the new toll collection system can buy a back-dated ticket on the e-toll website  to avoid the latter type of fine. Such a ticket should be bought no later than 3 days (i.e. 72 hours) after the drive. (Note: The tickets are valid for 48 hours and as of 2022, the e-toll website allows one to buy a back-dated ticket with the expiration hour set within the last 72 hours, which effectively might give one a possibility to cover a drive which had begun up to 5 days prior; this information is possibly subject to change without notice, as the regulation only asserts the possibility of buying a ticket up to 72 hours after the drive and it is therefore advisable to stick to this official period).

Manual Toll Collection System 
The toll booths and toll stations are located at the ends of privately-owned motorway sections.
In the open system, two toll stations are located at the ends of the section. A person driving the whole distance pays at both gates, while a person entering or leaving the motorway mid-section pays only at one gate. In the closed system, there are toll stations on every interchange both entering and exiting the tolled section. The driver receives a ticket upon entering the motorway and pays on the exit, with the price dependent on the distance driven.

In case of sections additionally supporting the electronic toll collection, a driver must choose between a "fast gate" for e-toll and a regular gate with manual toll collection.

Tolled sections 
The following list of tolled sections is valid as of 2023, and only applies to vehicles up to 3.5 tons of maximum permissible weight. The prices listed apply to passenger cars driving the section's whole length.

 Motorway A1:
 Tolled:  Gdańsk – Toruń (managed by Gdańsk Transport Company): both electronic and manual (closed) systems available, 30 PLN ($)
 Free:  Toruń – Czech border

 Motorway A2:
 Free:  German border – Rzepin
 Tolled:  Rzepin – Poznań (managed by Autostrada Eksploatacja S.A.): manual (closed) system only, 38 PLN ($)
 Free:  Poznań bypass
 Tolled:  Poznań – Sługocin (managed by Autostrada Eksploatacja S.A.):  manual (open) system only, 40 PLN ($)
 Free:  Sługocin – Konin
 Tolled:  Konin – Łódź (managed by the state): electronic system only, 10 PLN ($)
 Free:  Łódź – Warsaw (including S2) – Mińsk Mazowiecki
 Under construction / design:  Mińsk Mazowiecki – Belarusian border

 Motorway A4:
 Free:  German border – Wrocław,
 Tolled:  Wrocław – Gliwice (managed by the state): electronic system only, 16 PLN ($)
 Free:  Gliwice – Mysłowice,
 Tolled:  Mysłowice – Kraków-Balice (managed by Stalexport Autostrada Malopolska S.A.): both electronic and manual (open) systems available, 20 PLN ($)
 Free:  Kraków-Balice (including Kraków bypass) – Ukrainian border
 Motorway A6: Free
 Motorway A8: Free
 Motorway A18: Free, of which over half of the length has only the first motorway carriageway constructed, carrying bidirectional traffic with 1 lane per direction, while the second carriageway is under reconstruction (these sections are not signed as a motorway)
 All expressways: Free

viaTOLL payment system (vehicles over 3.5 tonnes) 

From 1.07.2011 all vehicles weighting more than 3.5 tons are obliged to have a special viaTOLL apparatus. On the chosen roads (some motorways, expressways and national roads) the special electronic readers are installed. They connect to the apparatus in the vehicle in a wireless way, and they also count the toll the vehicle has to pay. It is possible to buy it on some petrol stations or at the special points of selling.

If the apparatus isn't at the place, fines are applied:
 1500 PLN if the car is heavier than 12 tons
 750 PLN if the car is heavier than 3.5 tons but lighter than 12 tons.

List of Polish motorways and expressways with progress of construction 

More notable among the changes introduced in later amendments include re-routing S8 and adding S61 instead (2009, a change related to the Rospuda Valley conflict), introducing S16 (2015, 2016), S52 (2016) and A50/S50 (2019), as well as extending S5 to Ostróda (2015) and to Bolków (2019), S10 to Wołomin (2015) and S8 to Kłodzko (2019).
The planned network consists of 16 major highways (over 200 km of intended length): A1, S3, S5, S7, S11, S17, S19 and S61 running north to south, and A2, A4, S6, S8, S10, S12, S16 and S74 running west to east. 4 shorter motorways and 9 expressways complete the planned network.

The following table summarizes the progress of construction of the motorway and expressway network:

Annual average daily traffic on Polish highways

The latest general measurement of annual average daily traffic in Poland was conducted in 2020. It was partially extended to 2021 
because some measurements had been cancelled due to the COVID-19 pandemic which would make their results unreliable.

Traffic volumes in Poland note rapid increase since the fall of communism in 1989: the average volumes recorded in 2020 amount to over 360% of the average volumes recorded in 1990. With the increasing traffic, the length of overburdened regular national roads (the measurement analysis defines a regular single carriageway country road as overburdened if recorded average annual traffic exceeds 15'000 vehicles per day) had also been steadily increasing until reaching the maximum of 1389 km in 2010. Due to large number of highway sections opened between 2010 and 2020, the number of overburdened roads in that decade has fallen down for the first time in history, and is equal to 1121 km in the 2020 measurement.

The following highways recorded the highest traffic volumes in 2020:

The other highest and lowest recorded AADT values were:

History

Before World War II 
The first plans of creation of a national highway network in Poland were conceived in the interwar period: Plans
The main promoter of this concept was Professor Melchior Wladyslaw Nestorowicz of the Warsaw University of Technology, who organized three Road Congresses, during which a group of specialists discussed the creation of the network. On March 5, 1939, in the trade magazine Drogowiec, Professor Nestorowicz proposed a very ambitious plan for the construction of almost 5,000 kilometres of category I and II roads, based on similar programmes in Germany and Italy. Nestorowicz sketched a map of the future system with the following routes:

First class roads would, according to the plans, consist of the following motorways (totalling some :
 Warsaw - Łódź - 100 km
 Warsaw – Poznań - Polish-German border - 350 km
 Warsaw beltway - 130 km
 Poznań beltway - 80 km
 Gdynia – Bydgoszcz – Łódź – 500 km
 Łódź beltway - 90 km
 Bytow - Free City of Danzig border - 50 km
 Katowice – Kraków – Lwów - 375 km
 Warsaw – Lublin - Lwów – Sniatyn - Polish-Romanian border - 550 km
 Puławy – Sandomierz – Przemyśl - 175 km

Second class roads would consist of the following motorways, totalling another :
 Piotrków Trybunalski - Kielce - Sandomierz - 180 km
 Warsaw – Kielce – Kraków - 180 km
 Łódź - Kalisz - Polish-German border north of Wrocław - 130 km
 Warsaw – Grodno – Vilnius – Polish - Lithuania - Latvian border near Daugavpils - 575 km
 Grodno - Nowogrodek - Polish-Soviet border near Minsk - 190 km
 Bydgoszcz – Poznań – Częstochowa - 350 km
 Katowice – Cieszyn – Polish-Czechoslovak border - 60 km
 Ostrołęka - Polish-East Prussian border - 50 km
 Grodno - Polish-Lithuanian border - 40 km
 Grodno - Brzesc nad Bugiem - Krasnystaw - 300 km
 Warsaw – Brzesc nad Bugiem - 170 km

In 1934, Nazi Germany started the construction of their motorway system, parts of which today form A18 and A4 to Wrocław (Breslau), as well as A6 Szczecin bypass and S22 (parts of the planned motorway to Königsberg). About half of them were constructed as single-carriageway with the intention of adding a second carriageway in later years. However, after 1938, warfare expenses meant little money would be invested into any infrastructure and only one 9 km single-carriageway piece west of Gliwice (now A4) was constructed.

In Poland, a 28 km stretch between Warlubie and Osiek (now DW214) was constructed in 1937 – 1939 in the motorway standard of the time (today not considered a highway) with a concrete surface, which was designed by Italian engineer Piero Puricelli. The motorway was planned to reach Gdynia, but the outbreak of the Second World War halted the plans.

1945 – 1972 

The Potsdam conference defined the borders for communist Poland, which were very different from the pre-1939 ones. It received the so-called Regained Territories from the former Third Reich with the aforementioned motorway sections (some of them with first carriageway only). Most of the motorway bridges were destroyed by the warfare, but only a few were repaired or rebuilt in the first post-war years. The bridge over Ina river was reconstructed in 1972, and those on S22 only between 1996 and 2003.

Apart from the bridges, almost all the motorways were left in the same condition as they were in 1945 until the mid-1990s. The only road left from Nazi times that was completed by the People's Republic of Poland was a one-carriageway small section between Łęczyca and Lisowo (15 km of what is now DW142), which was built on the previous works of Nazis.

Plans
At the post-war year there were very ambitious plans to make a motorway network for the whole Poland. For example, engineer Eugeniusz Buszma has published his propositions to the network in the magazine "Drogowiec" (1946, issue 1):
 East – West (Słubice – Warsaw – Białystok) – 680 km
 North – South (Gdynia – Warsaw – Balkans) – 650 km
 Silesia – Baltic I (Gdańsk – Łódź – Katowice) – 460 km
 Pomeranian (Gdańsk – Szczecin) – 280 km
 Silesian (Wrocław – Katowice – Kraków) – 190 km
 Mazurian (Kaliningrad – Elbląg – Malbork) – 20 km
 Silesia – Baltic II (Bydgoszcz – Wrocław) – 260 km
 Łódź – Wrocław – (Prague) – 310 km
 Katowice – (Vienna) – 60 km
 Poznań – Szczecin – 200 km
 Radom – Lublin – (Lviv) – 220 km

After the addition of the sections built by the Third Reich the total network length had to be ca. 3700 km. In 1963 the Motorization Council at the Council of Ministers had presented the similar plan plus the motorways: Warsaw-Kraków-Zakopane, Kraków-Przemyśl, Warsaw-Bydgoszcz-Koszalin, Poznań-Koszalin i Warsaw-Terespol (ca. 1250 km). None of those plans were realized, however.
Despite announcing such pompous plans, no motorway was opened in the meantime.

In the 1970s 

Only in the 1970s did any works start. In 1972 it was planned to build:
Plans
 the Gliwice-Kraków motorway (now A4)
 the second carriageway of the Wrocław-Gliwice motorway (also A4)
 the Warsaw-Katowice motorway (so-called "Gierkówka", now the S8/A1 road), in the near future

The plans were expanded in 1976 by the following sections:
 Tarnów – Kraków (now A4),
 eastern GOP (Górnośląski Okręg Przemysłowy) bypass (now S1, northern part),
 Bielsko-Biała – Cieszyn (now S52, southern part),
 Warszawa – Poznań (so-called Olimpijka, now A2),
 Łódź – Piotrków Trybunalski (now A1).

In 1973 – 1976, "Gierkówka" dual carriageway from Warsaw to Katowice was built. Originally planned as a motorway, it was in the end constructed by adding another carriageway to the existing road, hence going through many villages and crossing with local roads. However, the part from Piotrków Trybunalski to Częstochowa was constructed on a new route in a semi-motorway standard: the road was constructed on a motorway alignment but majority of the intersections between the highway and the other roads were constructed as one-level with no viaducts or overpasses.

In the 1980s 

Near the end of 1970s the first construction of motorways started and continued to the next decade. The roads opened in the 1980s were the first motorways and expressways which generally meet the contemporary standards (at least with respect to their more important attributes), although in several cases their poor quality forced major renovations to be performed as soon as within the first 20 years of operation, in order to adhere to the contemporary standards.

In 1985 the government already planned to build the expressways apart from the motorways. The major routes planned as motorways were A1, A2 and A4.

In the 1990s 
In the III Republic of Poland the plans started to change again. Planned S3 was promoted to a motorway standard as A3 (the decision was later reversed) and a plan was introduced (also later reversed) of constructing the highway Łódź – Wrocław – Bolków in a motorway standard as A8. Szczecin bypass (A6) and Olszyna – Krzywa (then named A12, now A4/A18) were promoted to motorways, even though at that time the majority of their lengths was in bad shape, laid with the original concrete surface from the 1930s with no significant works having been performed on any of them throughout the communist period.

In the 2000s 

As of the end of 1999, vast majority of national and international traffic routes were served by regular national roads, most of them leading through the cities, towns and villages, and most of them single carriageway. Only the following number of highways was present:

Before Poland received the EU membership 

A few years before Poland entered the EU the tempo of motorway construction increased significantly. The main focus was on the east–west motorways A4 and A2. In 2002, a long-awaited renovation of the A4 from Krzywa to Wrocław (93 km) has started, which included laying new high quality surface in place of the Nazi German concrete slabs, reconstruction of all the pre-WWII bridges on the motorway and renovation of the viaducts above the motorway.

This is also a period when Poland started introducing motorway tolls, first in 2000 for the A4 section between Mysłowice and Kraków.

Poland in European Union 
1 May 2004 was a crucial day for the history of motorway construction, and that is when the highway boom started. One of major advantages of signing the European Union access document was that Poland could get access to large funds for co-financing the construction of new roads and upgrades of the existing road infrastructure.

These years, the existing scattered pieces of highways started to converge into the basis of the future network:
 in 2005, A4 connected Wrocław with Katowice and Kraków, while in 2009 – with Germany;
 in 2006, A2 connected Poznań with Łódź.
A large number of expressway bypasses of towns were also constructed at this time. On some of them, only one carriageway was built (with the allocated space prepared for easy construction of the second carriageway later).

2011 – 2015

The sections opened in 2011 – 2015 belonged to the following highways:
 : +  (A1 on the section Gdańsk – Łódź was completed in 2014)
 : +  (A2 on the section Germany – Warsaw was completed in 2012)
 : +  (S3 on the section Szczecin – A2 – Zielona Góra was completed in 2013, except that the older single-carriageway parts remained so until 2017)
 : + 
 : + 
 : +  (S8 on the section Wrocław – Łódź was completed in 2014) 
 : +  in total

2016 – 2020
After the peak of investments before Euro 2012, very few new sections have been contracted in 2012 and 2013, which resulted in a small number of sections opened in 2015 and 2016, large share of which were the last delayed fragments originally contracted for a Euro 2012 opening. In particular:
 Also in 2016, the delayed bypass of Łódź was finished, making  completed on its whole route except for those sections where national road 1 had already been a dual carriageway (see In the 1970s), allowing for a significantly lower priority of constructing the remaining stretch compared to other highways.

Since 2014, the number of signed contracts has risen again, resulting in the number of road openings having risen again since 2017.

The sections opened in 2016 – 2020 belonged to the following highways:
 : + 
 : +  (S5 on the section Poznań – Wrocław was completed in 2019)
 : +  (S6 on the section Szczecin – Koszalin was completed in 2019)
 : + 
 : +  (S8 was completed on its originally intended route from Wrocław to Białystok in 2019; an extension to Kłodzko was later added to the plans)
 : +  (S17 on the section Warsaw – Lublin was completed in 2020)
 : +  in total (A1 and A4: see above)

2021 – present

The sections opened, or planned to get opened, in 2021 – 2025 belong to the following highways:
 : + 
 : +  (S3 is scheduled to get completed in 2024)
 : +  (S6 on the section Koszalin – Gdańsk is scheduled to get completed in 2025)
 : +  (S7 on the section Warsaw – Kraków is scheduled to get completed in 2024)
 : +  (S19 "Via Carpathia" on the section Lublin – Rzeszów was completed in 2022, except that the older fragment with 2+1 lanes will remain so until 2026)
 : +  (S61 "Via Baltica" is scheduled to get completed in 2025)
 : +  in total

Total length of motorways and expressways in Poland (end of the year)

See also 
Classes and categories of public roads in Poland
 
 List of controlled-access highway systems
 Evolution of motorway construction in European nations

References

External links 

 General Directorate for National Roads and Motorways (in Polish, some information also in English)

 Roads in Poland
Poland, Roads
Roads
Lists of buildings and structures in Poland